The 2018 K League 1 was the 36th season of the top division of professional football in South Korea since its establishment in 1983, and the sixth season of the K League 1, former K League Classic. The K League Classic was changed its name to "K League 1" in this season. As the 2018 FIFA World Cup start on 14 June, the last round before stoppage will be held on 19–20 May. The league will resume games on 7 July.

Teams

General information

Stadiums

Foreign players
Restricting the number of foreign players strictly to four per team, including a slot for a player from AFC countries. A team could use four foreign players on the field each game including a least one player from the AFC confederation. Players name in bold are registered during the mid-season transfer window.

League table

Positions by matchday

Round 1–33

Round 34–38

Results

Matches 1–22 
Teams play each other twice, once at home, once away.

Matches 23–33
Teams play every other team once (either at home or away).

Matches 34–38
After 33 matches, the league splits into two sections of six teams each, with teams playing every other team in their section once (either at home or away). The exact matches are determined upon the league table at the time of the split.

Group A

Group B

Relegation playoffs

Player statistics

Top scorers

Source:

Top assist providers

Source:

Awards

Main awards 
The 2018 K League Awards was held on 3 December 2018.

Source:

Best XI 

Source:

Player of the Round

Manager of the Month

Attendance
Attendants who entered with free ticket are not counted.

See also
2018 in South Korean football
2018 K League 2
2018 Korean FA Cup

References

External links

K League 1 seasons